Madame DuBarry is a 1919 German silent film on the life of Madame Du Barry. It was directed by Ernst Lubitsch, written by Norbert Falk and Hanns Kräly with the title role taken by Pola Negri and Louis XV played by Emil Jannings. Its alternative title for United States distribution was Passion.

It was made at the Tempelhof Studios in Berlin. The film's sets were designed by the art director Kurt Richter.

Cast
Pola Negri as Madame DuBarry, The Former Jeanne Vaubernier
Emil Jannings as Louis XV
Harry Liedtke as Armand de Foix
Eduard von Winterstein as Count Jean DuBarry
Reinhold Schünzel as Minister Choiseul
Else Berna as Geneviève de Gramont
Fred Immler as Duke of Richelieu
Gustav Czimeg as Aiguillon
Alexander Eckert as Paillet the shoemaker

Survival status
The film has been released on DVD. In 2014, it was released on dual format Blu-ray and DVD as part of the Masters of Cinema series.

References

External links

1919 films
1910s historical films
German historical films
German biographical films
German epic films
Films of the Weimar Republic
German silent feature films
Films directed by Ernst Lubitsch
Biographical films about French royalty
Works about Louis XV
Films set in the 1760s
Films set in the 1770s
Films set in the 1780s
Films set in the 1790s
Films set in France
German black-and-white films
Films shot at Tempelhof Studios
Cultural depictions of Louis XV
Cultural depictions of Madame du Barry
UFA GmbH films
Films based on works by Alexandre Dumas
Silent adventure films
1910s German films